Desmanthodium is a genus of flowering plants in the family Asteraceae.

 Species
 Desmanthodium blepharopodum S.F.Blake - Venezuela (Trujillo State)
 Desmanthodium fruticosum Greenm. - Jalisco, Nayarit, Guerrero, Colima, Oaxaca, Michoacán, México State
 Desmanthodium guatemalense Hemsl. - Guatemala, Honduras, El Salvador
 Desmanthodium hintoniorum B.L.Turner - Oaxaca
 Desmanthodium lanceolatum Greenm. - Morelos, México State
 Desmanthodium ovatum Benth. - Oaxaca, Morelos, México State
 Desmanthodium perfoliatum Benth. - Oaxaca, Chiapas, México State, Guerrero
 Desmanthodium tomentosum Brandegee - Guatemala, Chiapas

References

Asteraceae genera
Millerieae